Jerry Turek (born 2 April 1975) is a former Canadian tennis player.

Turek has a career high ATP singles ranking of world No. 1089, achieved on 14 August 1995. He also has a career high ATP doubles ranking of world No. 183 achieved on 11 June 2001.

Turek made his ATP main draw debut at the 1998 Canadian Open receiving a wild card that granted him direct entry in the doubles main draw. Partnering compatriot Simon Larose, the pair lost in the first round to American pairing Donald Johnson and Francisco Montana in three sets.

Turek reached 11 career doubles finals, with a record of 7 wins and 4 losses which includes a 2–1 record in ATP Challenger finals. He was never able to reach a single final in his career, at any level.

ATP Challenger and ITF Futures finals

Doubles: 11 (7–4)

External links

1975 births
Living people
Canadian male tennis players
Canadian people of Czech descent
20th-century Canadian people
21st-century Canadian people